My Giant Life is an American reality television series that premiered on the TLC cable network, on July 14, 2015. Season 2 follows three of the four women from the first season, with Nancy Mulkey replaced by a new woman,  German-born New Yorker Katja, and her  American wife.

Episodes

Series overview

Season 1 (2015)

Season 2 (2016)

Season 3 (2017)

Broadcast
Internationally, the series premiered in Australia on October 6, 2015, on TLC.

References

External links
 
 

2010s American reality television series
2015 American television series debuts
2017 American television series endings
English-language television shows
TLC (TV network) original programming